The Baltimore County Fire Department (B.Co.F.D.) provides fire protection and emergency medical services to the 800,000 residents of Baltimore County, Maryland. The department consists of both county operated and full-time staffed stations and independent volunteer companies located throughout the county.  In 2018, the department responded to 144,919 calls for help.

History 
Sworn in as fire chief on July 1, 2019, Joanne R. Rund became the first female chief to be permanently appointed to the position.

Stations and apparatus 

As of 2020, the department is composed of 25 career staffed fire stations. Stations 1,4,6 and 7 have 2 Engines.

Volunteer companies 
The department is also supported by 29 volunteer fire companies, which respond to emergencies within their respective jurisdictions. Station 30 has 3 engines while other stations have 2 engines. Each company is organized as an independent corporation under the Baltimore County Volunteer Fireman's Association (BCVFA).

References 

Baltimore County, Maryland